Left communism, or the communist left, is a position held by the left wing of communism, which criticises the political ideas and practices espoused by Marxist–Leninists and social democrats. Left communists assert positions which they regard as more authentically Marxist than the views of Marxism–Leninism espoused by the Communist International after its Bolshevization by Joseph Stalin and during its second congress.

In general, there are two currents of left communism, namely the Italian and Dutch–German left. The communist left in Italy was formed during World War I in organizations like the Italian Socialist Party and the Communist Party of Italy. The Italian left considers itself to be Leninist in nature, but denounces Marxism–Leninism as a form of bourgeois opportunism materialized in the Soviet Union under Stalin. The Italian left is currently embodied in organizations such as the Internationalist Communist Party and the International Communist Party. The Dutch–German left split from Vladimir Lenin prior to Stalin's rule and supports a firmly council communist and libertarian Marxist viewpoint as opposed to the Italian left which emphasised the need for an international revolutionary party.

Left communism differs from most other forms of Marxism in believing that communists should not participate in bourgeois parliaments, and some argue against participating in conservative trade unions. However, many left communists split over their criticism of the Bolsheviks. Council communists criticised the Bolsheviks for elitist party functions and emphasised a more autonomous organisation of the working class, without political parties.

Although she was murdered in 1919 before left communism became a distinct tendency, Rosa Luxemburg has been heavily influential for most left communists, both politically and theoretically. Proponents of left communism have included Herman Gorter, Antonie Pannekoek, Otto Rühle, Karl Korsch, Amadeo Bordiga and Paul Mattick. Other proponents of left communism have included Onorato Damen, Jacques Camatte, and Sylvia Pankhurst. Later prominent theorists are shared with other tendencies such as Antonio Negri, a founding theorist of the autonomist tendency. Specific currents that can be labelled part of left communism include Bordigism, Luxemburgism, and communization.

Early history and overview 
Two major traditions can be observed within left communism, namely the Dutch–German current and the Italian current. The political positions those traditions share are opposition to popular fronts, to many kinds of nationalism and national liberation movements and to parliamentarianism.

The historical origins of left communism come from World War I. Most left communists are supportive of the October Revolution in Russia, but retain a critical view of its development. However, some in the Dutch–German current would in later years come to reject the idea that the revolution had a proletarian or socialist nature, arguing that it had simply carried out the tasks of the bourgeois revolution by creating a state capitalist system.

Left communism first came into focus as a distinct movement around 1918. Its essential features were a stress on the need to build a communist party or workers' council entirely separate from the reformist and centrist elements who "betrayed the proletariat", opposition to all but the most restricted participation in elections and an emphasis on militancy. Apart from this, there was little in common between the two wings. Only the Italians accepted the need for electoral work at all for a very short period of time which they later vehemently opposed, attracting criticism from Vladimir Lenin in "Left-Wing" Communism: An Infantile Disorder.

Russian left communism 
Left Bolshevism emerged in 1907 as the Vpered group challenged Vladimir Lenin's perceived authoritarianism and parliamentarianism. The group included Alexander Bogdanov, Maxim Gorky, Anatoly Lunacharsky, Mikhail Pokrovsky, Grigory Aleksinsky, Stanislav Volski and Martyn Liadov. The Otzovists, or Recallists, advocated the recall of RSDLP representatives from the Third Duma. Bogdanov and his allies accused Lenin and his partisans of promoting liberal democracy through "parliamentarism at any price".

In 1918, a faction emerged within the Russian Communist Party named the Left Communists which opposed the signing of the Brest-Litovsk peace treaty with Imperial Germany. The Left Communists wanted international proletarian revolution across the world. In the beginning, the leader of this faction was Nikolai Bukharin. They stood for a revolutionary war against the Central Powers; opposed the right of nations to self-determination (specifically in the case of Poland since there were many Poles in this communist group and they did not want a Polish capitalist state to be established); and they generally took a voluntarist stance regarding the possibilities for social revolution at that time. They began to publish the newspaper Kommunist. 

The Left Communists faded as the world revolutionary wave died down in militancy as Lenin had proved too strong a figure. They also lost Bukharin as a leading figure since his position became more right-wing until he eventually came to agree with Lenin. Being defeated in internal debates, they then dissolved. A few very small left communist groups surfaced within the RSFSR in the next few years, but later fell victim to repression by the state. In many ways, the positions of the Left Communists were inherited by the Workers' Opposition faction and Gavril Myasnikov's Workers Group of the Russian Communist Party and to some extent by the Decists.

Dutch–German left communism until 1933 

Left communism emerged in both countries together and was always very closely connected. Among the leading theoreticians of the more powerful German movement were Antonie Pannekoek and Herman Gorter and German activists found refuge in the Netherlands after the Nazis came to power in 1933. The critique of social democratic reformism can be traced back before World War I since in the Netherlands a revolutionary wing of social democracy had broken from the reformist party even before the war and had built links with German activists. By 1915, the Antinational Socialist Party was founded by Franz Pfemfert and was linked to Die Aktion. After the beginning of the German Revolution in 1918, a leftist mood could be found among sections of the communist parties of both countries. In Germany, this led directly to the foundation of the Communist Workers Party of Germany (KAPD) after its leading figures were expelled from the Communist Party of Germany (KPD) by Paul Levi. This development was mirrored in the Netherlands and on a smaller scale in Bulgaria, where the left communist movement was to mimic that of Germany.

When it was founded, the KAPD included some tens of thousands of revolutionaries. However, it had broken up and practically dissolved within a few years. This was because it was founded on the basis of revolutionary optimism and a purism that rejected what became known as frontism. Frontism entailed working in the same organisations as reformist workers. Such work was seen by the KAPD as unhelpful at a time when the revolution was thought to be an imminent event and not merely a goal to be aimed at. This led the members of the KAPD to reject working in the traditional trade unions in favour of forming their own revolutionary unions. These unionen, so called to distinguish them from the official trade unions, had 80,000 members in 1920 and peaked in 1921 with 200,000 members, after which they declined rapidly. They were also organisationally divided from the beginning, with those unionen linked to the KAPD forming the AAU-D and those in Saxony around Otto Rühle who opposed the conception of a party in favour of a unitary class organisation being organised as the AAU-E.

The KAPD was unable to reach even its founding congress prior to suffering its first split when the so-called National Bolshevik tendency around Fritz Wolffheim and Heinrich Laufenberg appeared (this tendency has no connection with modern political tendencies in Russia which use the same name). More seriously, the KAPD lost most of its support very rapidly as it failed to develop lasting structures. This also contributed to internecine quarrels and the party actually split into two competing tendencies known as the Essen and Berlin tendencies to the historians of the left. The recently established Communist Workers International (KAI) split on exactly the same lines as did the tiny Communist Workers Party of Bulgaria. The only other affiliates of the KAI were the Communist Workers Party of Britain led by Sylvia Pankhurst, the Communist Workers Party of the Netherlands (KAPN) in the Netherlands and a group in Russia. The AAU-D split on the same lines and it rapidly ceased to exist as a real tendency within the factories.

Left communism and the Communist International 

Left communists generally supported the Bolshevik seizure of power in October 1917 and entertained enormous hopes in the founding of the Communist International, or Comintern. In fact, they controlled the first body formed by the Comintern to coordinate its activities in Western Europe, the Amsterdam Bureau. However, this was little more than a very brief interlude and the Amsterdam Bureau never functioned as a leadership body for Western Europe as was originally intended. The Vienna Bureau of the Comintern may also be classified as left communist, but its personnel were not to evolve into either of the two historic currents that made up left communism. Rather, the Vienna Bureau adopted the ultra-left ideas of the earliest period in the history of the Comintern.

Left communists supported the Russian revolution, but did not accept the methods of the Bolsheviks. Many of the Dutch–German tradition adopted Rosa Luxemburg's criticism as outlined in her posthumously published essay entitled The Russian Revolution. In this essay, she rejected the Bolshevik position on distribution of land to the peasantry and their espousal of the right of nations to self-determination which she rejected as historically outmoded. The Italian left communists did not at the time accept any of these criticisms and both currents would evolve.

To a considerable degree, Lenin's well known polemic Left-Wing Communism: An Infantile Disorder is an attack on the ideas of the emerging left communist currents. His main aim was to polemicise with currents moving towards pure revolutionary tactics by showing them that they could remain based on firmly revolutionary principles while utilising a variety of tactics. Therefore, Lenin defended the use of parliamentarism and working within the official trade unions.

As the Kronstadt rebellion occurred at a time when the debate on tactics was still raging within the Comintern, it has been wrongly seen as being left communist by some commentators. In fact, the left communist currents had no connection with the rebellion, although they did rally to its support when they learned of it. In later years, the German–Dutch tradition in particular would come to see the suppression of the revolt as the historic turning point in the evolution of the Russian state after October 1917.

1939–1945 

Many small currents to the left of the mass communist parties collapsed at the beginning of World War II and the left communists were initially silent too. Despite having foreseen the war more clearly than some other factions, when it began they were overwhelmed. Many were persecuted by either German Nazism or Italian fascism. Leading militants of the communist left such as Mitchell, who was Jewish, were to die in the Buchenwald concentration camp.

Meanwhile, the final council communist groups in Germany had disappeared in the maelstrom and the International Communist Group (GIK) in the Netherlands was moribund. The former centrist group led by Henk Sneevliet (the Revolutionary Socialist Workers Party, RSAP) transformed itself into the Marx–Lenin–Luxemburg Front. In April 1942, its leadership was arrested by the Gestapo and killed. The remaining activists then split into two camps as some turned to Trotskyism forming the Committee of Revolutionary Marxists (CRM) while the majority formed the CommunistenBond-Spartacus. The latter group turned to council communism and was joined by most members of the GIK.

In 1941, the Italian fraction was reorganised in France and along with the new French Nucleus of the Communist Left came into conflict with the ideas which the fraction had propagated from 1936, namely of the social disappearance of the proletariat and localised wars and so on. These ideas continued to be defended by Vercesi in Brussels. Gradually, the left fractions adopted positions drawn from German left communism. They abandoned the conception that the Russian state remained in some way proletarian and also dropped Vercesi's conception of localised wars in favour of ideas on imperialism inspired by Rosa Luxemburg. Vercesi's participation in a Red Cross committee was also fiercely contested.

The strike at FIAT in October 1942 had a huge impact on the Italian fraction, which was deepened by the fall of Mussolini's regime in July 1943. The Italian fraction now saw a pre-revolutionary situation opening in Italy and prepared to participate in the coming revolution. In 1943 the Internationalist Communist Party was founded by Onorato Damen and Luciano Stefanini, amongst others. By 1945 the party had 5,000 members all over Italy with some supporters in France, Belgium and the US. It published a Manifesto of the Communist Left to the European Proletariat, which called upon workers to put class war before national war.

In France, revived by Marco in Marseilles, the Italian fraction now worked closely with the new French fraction, which was formally founded in Paris in December 1944. However, in May 1945 the Italian fraction, many of whose members had already returned to Italy, voted to dissolve itself so that its militants could integrate themselves as individuals into the Internationalist Communist Party. The conference at which this decision was made also refused to recognise the French fraction and expelled Marco from their group.

The history of the GCF belongs to the post-war period. Meanwhile, the former members of the French fraction who sympathised with Vercesi and the Internationalist Communist Party formed a new French fraction which published the journal  and was joined at the end of 1945 by the old minority of the fraction who had joined  in the 1930s.

One other development during the war years merits mention at this point. A small grouping of German and Austrian militants came close to left communist positions in these years. Best known as the Revolutionary Communist Organisation, these young militants were exiles from Nazism living in France at the start of World War II and were members of the Trotskyist movement but they had opposed the formation of the Fourth International in 1938 on the grounds that it was premature. They were refused full delegates' credentials and only admitted to the founding conference of the Youth International on the following day. They then joined Hugo Oehler's International Contact Commission for the Fourth (Communist) International and in 1939 were publishing  in Antwerp.

With the beginning of the war, they took the name Revolutionary Communists of Germany (RKD) and came to define Russia as state capitalist in agreement with Ante Ciliga's book The Russian Enigma. At this point, they adopted a revolutionary defeatist position on the war and condemned Trotskyism for its critical defence of Russia (which was seen by Trotskyists as a degenerated workers' state). The CR and RKD were autonomous and clandestine, but worked closely together with shared politics. As the war ran its course, they evolved in a councilist direction while also identifying more and more with Luxemburg's work. They also worked with the French Fraction of the Communist Left and seem to have disintegrated at the end of the war. This disintegration was sped no doubt by the capture of leading militant Karl Fischer, who was sent to the Buchenwald concentration camp where he was to participate in writing the Declaration of the Internationalist Communists of Buchenwald when the camp was liberated.

1952–1968 

The year 1952 signalled the end of mass influence on the part of Italian left communism as its sole remaining representative, the Internationalist Communist Party, split in two sections: the group led by Bordiga took the name International Communist Party, while the group around Damen retained the name Internationalist Communist Party. The Gauche Communiste de France (GCF) dissolved in the same year. Left communists entered a period of almost constant decline from this point onwards, although they were somewhat rejuvenated by the events of 1968.

Examples of left communism ideological currents existed in China during the Great Proletarian Cultural Revolution (GPCR). For example, the Hunan rebel group the Shengwulian argued for "smashing" the existing state apparatus and establishing a "People's Commune of China" based on the democratic ideals of the Paris Commune.

Since 1968 
The uprisings of May 1968 led to a large resurgence of interest in left communist ideas in France where various groups were formed and published journals regularly until the late 1980s when the interest started to fade. A tendency called communization was invented in the early 1970s by French left communists, synthesizing different currents of left communism. It remains influential in libertarian marxist and left communist circles today. Outside of France, various small left communist groups emerged, predominantly in the leading capitalist countries. In the late 1970s and early 1980s the Internationalist Communist Party initiated a series of conferences of the communist left to engage those new elements, also attended by the International Communist Current. As a result of these, in 1983 the International Bureau for the Revolutionary Party (later renamed as the Internationalist Communist Tendency) was established by the Internationalist Communist Party and the British Communist Workers Organisation.

Prominent post-1968 proponents of left communism have included Paul Mattick and Maximilien Rubel. Prominent left communist groups existing today include the International Communist Party, the International Communist Current and the Internationalist Communist Tendency. In addition to the left communist groups in the direct lineage of the Italian and Dutch traditions, a number of groups with similar positions have flourished since 1968, such as the workerist and autonomist movements in Italy; Kolinko, Kurasje, Wildcat; Subversion and Aufheben in England;  in France; TPTG and Blaumachen in Greece; Kamunist Kranti in India; and Collective Action Notes and Loren Goldner in the United States.

See also 

 Marxism
 Orthodox Marxism
 Autonomism
 Authoritarian socialism
 Council communism
 Left-wing politics
 Left communism in China
 Libertarian socialism
 List of left-wing internationals
 List of left communists
 Luxemburgism
 Ultra-leftism

References

Further reading 
 Non-Leninist Marxism: Writings on the Workers Councils (2007) (includes texts by Herman Gorter, Antonie Pannekoek, Sylvia Pankhurst and Otto Rühle). St. Petersburg, Florida: Red and Black Publishers. .
 Alexandra Kollontai: Selected Writing. Allison & Busby, 1984. 
 Pannekoek, Anton. Workers Councils. AK Press, 2003. Introduction by Noam Chomsky
 The International Communist Current, itself a left communist grouping, has produced a series of studies of what it views as its own antecedents. In particular, the book on the Dutch–German current, which is by Philippe Bourrinet (who later left the ICC), contains an exhaustive bibliography.
The Italian Communist Left 1926–1945.
 The Dutch-German Communist Left.
 The Russian Communist Left, 1918–1930.
 The British Communist Left, 1914–1945.
 Also of interest is volume 5 number 4 of Spring 1995 of the journal Revolutionary History. "Through Fascism, War and Revolution: Trotskyism and Left Communism in Italy".
 In addition, there is a good deal of material published on the Internet in various languages. A useful starting point is the Left Communism collection published on the Marxists Internet Archive.

 
Communism
Anti-Stalinist left
Marxist schools of thought
Types of socialism
Anti-anarchism